Uwe is a German masculine given name that may refer to:

Association football players and managers
Uwe Bredow (born 1961), German football player
Uwe Ehlers (born 1975), German football player and manager
Uwe Erkenbrecher (born 1954), German football player and manager
Uwe Freiler (born 1966), German football player
Uwe Fuchs (born 1966), German football player and manager
Uwe Hünemeier (born 1986), German football defender
Uwe Jahn (born 1954), German football coach
Uwe Koschinat (born 1971), German football player and manager
Uwe Möhrle (born 1979), German football defender
Uwe Neuhaus (born 1959), German football player and manager
Hans-Uwe Pilz (born 1958), German football player
Uwe Rahn (born 1962), German football midfielder
Uwe Rösler (born 1968), German football player and manager
Uwe Seeler (1936–2022), German football player and official
Uwe Tschiskale (born 1962), German football player
Uwe Wegmann (born 1964), German football player and manager

Other sportsmen
Uwe Adler (born 1944), German modern pentathlete
Uwe Alzen (born 1967), German racing driver
Uwe Beyer (1945–1993), West German hammer thrower
Uwe Eisenreich (born 1958), German bobsledder
Uwe Gasch (born 1961), German rower
Uwe Gensheimer (born 1986), German handball player
Uwe Helu (born 1990), Tongan/Japanese rugby player 
Uwe Heppner (born 1960), German rower
Uwe Krupp (born 1965), German hockey player and coach
Uwe Maerz (born 1969), German lightweight rower
Uwe Nepp (born 1966), German cyclist
Uwe Proske (born 1961), German fencer
Uwe Rathjen (1943–2019), West German former handball player 
Uwe Römer (born 1969), German fencer
Uwe Schwenker (born 1959), West German handball player

Politicians and diplomats
Uwe Barschel (1944–1987), German politician
Uwe Barth (born 1964), German politician
Uwe Beckmeyer (born 1949), German politician
Uwe Corsepius (born 1960), German diplomat
Jörg-Uwe Hahn (born 1956), German politician
Kai-Uwe von Hassel (1913–1997), German politician
Uwe Hüser (born 1958), German politician
Uwe Schummer (born 1957), German politician
Uwe Schünemann (born 1964), German politician

Scientists
Uwe Backes (born 1960), German political scientist
Klaus-Uwe Gerhardt (born 1955), German economist, columnist, and author
Kai-Uwe Hinrichs, German biogeochemist and organic geochemist
Uwe Ludewig (born 1967), German agricultural scientist 
Uwe Marx (born 1964), German physician and biotechnologist
Uwe Reinhardt (1937–2017), German-born economist
Uwe Schöning (born 1955), German computer scientist
Uwe Wagschal (born 1966), German political scientist
Uwe Windhorst, German neuroscientist and cyberneticist

Other
Uwe Bahnsen (1930–2013), German car designer
Hans-Uwe Bauer (born 1955), German actor
Uwe Boll (born 1965), German filmmaker
Uwe Böhnhardt (1977–2011), German right-wing extremist
Uwe Buß (born 1967), German theologian and author of young adult novels
Jörn-Uwe Fahrenkrog-Petersen (born 1960), German keyboard player, producer and composer
Uwe Grodd (born 1958), German conductor and flautist
Uwe Johnson (1934–1984), German writer
Marc-Uwe Kling (born 1982), German songwriter
Uwe Kröger (born 1964), German musician
Uwe Eric Laufenberg (born 1960), German actor and theatre manager
Uwe Mund (disambiguation) – multiple people
Uwe Mundlos (1973–2011), German right-wing terrorist and serial killer 
Uwe Nettelbeck (1940–2007), German record producer and writer
Uwe Ochsenknecht (born 1956), German actor and singer 
Uwe Ommer (born 1943), German photographer
Uwe Rosenberg (born 1970), German game designer
Uwe Schmidt (born 1968), German musician
Uwe Scholz (1958–2004), German ballet dancer and choreographer
Uwe Timm (born 1940), German writer
Uwe Timm (libertarian author) (1932–2014), German writer, anarchist, and anti-militarist
Uwe Wittwer (born 1954), Swiss artist

See also
Ove
Owe

German masculine given names